This is a list of Pancrase champions at each weight class. Pancrase is a Japan-based mixed martial arts (MMA) promoting and sanctioning organization founded in 1993. The champions of Pancrase are referred to by the title of "King of Pancrase".

Men's Title Histories

Heavyweight Championship
Weight limit: 

Light Heavyweight Championship
Weight limit: 
Formerly known as Cruiserweight until 2008

Middleweight Championship
Weight limit: 

Welterweight Championship
Weight limit: 
Formerly known as Lightweight until 2006

Lightweight Championship
Weight limit:

Featherweight Championship
Weight limit: 
Formerly known as Lightweight until 2008

Bantamweight Championship
Weight limit: 

Flyweight Championship
Weight limit: 

Strawweight Championship
Weight limit: 

Women's Title Histories

Women's Bantamweight Championship
Weight limit: 

Women's Flyweight Championship
Weight limit: 

Women's Strawweight Championship
Weight limit:

Retired Titles

Openweight Championship
No weight restrictions

Super Heavyweight Championship
Weight limit: Unlimited
On January 30, 2008 Pancrase adopted a variant of Unified Rules of Mixed Martial Arts and retires the Super Heavyweight Championship.PANCRASE Official Site

Light Flyweight Championship
Weight limit: 
This weight class was disabled in 2016

By nationality

The following include championship title holders by nationality.

References and footnotes

See also 
 List of current mixed martial arts champions
 List of Bellator MMA champions
 List of Dream champions
 List of EliteXC champions
 List of Invicta FC champions
 List of ONE Championship champions
 List of Pride champions
 List of PFL champions
 List of Road FC champions
 List of Shooto champions
 List of Strikeforce champions
 List of UFC champions
 List of WEC champions
 Mixed martial arts weight classes

External links
 Pancrase Official Site
 
 Wrestling-Titles.com: Pancrase

Pancrase Champions
Mixed martial arts champions